Knud Kastrup (7 January 1898 – 17 October 1954) was a Danish footballer. He played in five matches for the Denmark national football team from 1923 to 1927.

References

External links
 

1898 births
1954 deaths
Danish men's footballers
Denmark international footballers
Place of birth missing
Association footballers not categorized by position